The 302d Operations Group is the operational flying component of the 302d Airlift Wing of the United States Air Force Reserve. It is stationed at Peterson Air Force Base, Colorado.

The group was activated during World War II as the 302d Bombardment Group, a Consolidated B-24 Liberator replacement training unit (RTU). It was originally a Second Air Force unit, it was reassigned to First Air Force in 1943. The group was inactivated in 1944 when the Army Air Forces reorganized its training units to make more efficient use of its manpower.

The group was redesignated the 302d Troop Carrier Group and activated in the Air Force Reserve in 1949.  The group was called to active duty in June 1951 and its personnel used as fillers for other units before the 302d was inactivated a week later.

The group was again activated in the reserves in 1952 and trained as an airlift unit until it was inactivated in 1958 when Continental Air Command converted its operational wings to the dual deputy system in which squadrons reported directly to wing headquarters.

The group was activated again when Air Force Reserve Command reorganized under the Combat Wing reorganization.

Mission
The 302 OG consists of one C-130 Hercules squadron, the 731st Airlift Squadron, which has the Modular Airborne Fire Fighting System mission. The group's personnel take part in tactical airlift training exercises and contingency and humanitarian airlift operations, both at home and abroad.

History
The group was activated during World War II as the 302d Bombardment Group, a Consolidated B-24 Liberator replacement training unit (RTU). It was originally a Second Air Force unit, it was reassigned to First Air Force in 1943. The group was inactivated in 1944 when the Army Air Forces reorganized its training units to make more efficient use of its manpower.

The group was redesignated the 302d Troop Carrier Group and activated in the Air Force Reserve in 1949.  The group was called to active duty in June 1951 and its personnel used as fillers for other units before the 302d was inactivated a week later.

The group was again activated in the reserves in 1952 and trained as an airlift unit until it was inactivated in 1958 when Continental Air Command converted its operational wings to the dual deputy system in which squadrons reported directly to wing headquarters.

The group was activated again in 1992 when Air Force Reserve Command reorganized under the Combat Wing reorganization.

Lineage
 Constituted as the 302d Bombardment Group (Heavy) on 28 January 1942
 Activated on 1 June 1942
 Inactivated on 10 April 1944
 Redesignated 302d Troop Carrier Group, Medium on 16 May 1949
 Activated in the reserve on 27 June 1949
 Redesignated 302d Troop Carrier Group, Heavy on 28 January 1950
 Ordered to active service on 1 June 1951
 Inactivated on 8 June 1951
 Redesignated 302d Troop Carrier Group, Medium on 26 May 1952
 Activated in the reserve on 14 June 1952
 Inactivated on 14 April 1959
 Redesignated 302d Tactical Airlift Group on 31 July 1985 (Remained inactive)
 Redesignated: 302d Operations Group on 1 August 1992 and activated in the reserve

Assignments
 Second Air Force, 1 June 1942
 16th Bombardment (later, 16th Bombardment Operational) Training Wing, 1 April 1943
 46th Bombardment Operational Training Wing, 1 September 1943
 First Air Force, 17 December 1943 – 10 April 1944
 302d Troop Carrier Wing, 27 June 1949 – 8 June 1951; 14 June 1952 – 14 April 1959
 302d Airlift Wing, 1 August 1992 – present

Components
 7th Space Operations Squadron: 1 May 1993 – 1 September 1997
 302d Operations Support Squadron (later 302d Operations Support Flight, 302d Operations Support Squadron): 1 August 1992 – present
 302d Airlift Control Flight, 1 August 1992 - c. 1997
 355th Bombardment (later Troop Carrier) Squadron: 1 June 1942 – 10 April 1944; 27 June 1949 – 8 June 1951; 14 June 1952 – 14 April 1959
 356th Bombardment (later Troop Carrier) Squadron: 1 June 1942 – 10 April 1944; 27 June 1949 – 28 January 1950; 14 June 1952 – 14 April 1959
 357th Bombardment (later Troop Carrier) Squadron: 1 June 1942 – 10 April 1944; 14 June 1952 – 16 November 1957
 420th Bombardment Squadron: 1 June 1942 – 10 April 1944
 731st Airlift Squadron: 1 August 1992 – present

Stations

 Geiger Field, Washington, 1 June 1942
 Davis-Monthan Field, Arizona, 1 June 1942
 Wendover Field, Utah, 30 July 1942
 Pueblo Army Air Base, Colorado, 30 September 1942
 Davis-Monthan Field, Arizona, 1 December 1942
 Clovis Army Air Field, New Mexico, 29 January 1943

 Langley Field, Virginia, 17 December 1943
 Chatham Army Air Field, Georgia, 9 March – 10 April 1944
 McChord Air Force Base, Washington, 27 June 1949 – 8 June 1951
 Clinton County Air Force Base, Ohio, 14 June 1952 – 14 April 1959
 Peterson Air Force Base, Colorado, 1 August 1992–present

Aircraft

 B-18, 1942
 C-78, 1942
 B-24, 1942–1943, 1943–1944
 C-82, 1949

 C-54, 1949–1950
 C-46, 1952–1957
 C-119, 1956–1959
 C-130, 1992–present

References

Notes

Bibliography

External links

Operations groups of the United States Air Force
Military units and formations in Colorado
Military units and formations of the United States Air Force Reserves